The 1983 East Texas State Lions football team represented East Texas State University—now known as Texas A&M University–Commerce—as a member of the Lone Star Conference (LSC) during the 1983 NCAA Division II football season. Led by 19th-year head coach Ernest Hawkins, the Lions compiled an overall record of 8–2 with a mark of 6–1 in conference play, sharing the LSC title with Southwest Texas State. It was the team team's final LSC title under Hawkins, who retired at the end of the 1985 season. East Texas State played home games at Memorial Stadium in Commerce, Texas

Schedule

Postseason awards

All-Americans
 Ricky Dirks, 2nd Team, Running Back

All-Lone Star Conference

LSC superlatives
 Coach of the year: Ernest Hawkins
 Outstanding Back of the Year: Kyle Mackey

LSC First Team
 Javier Cardenas, Tight End
 Ricky Dirks, Runinng Back
 Alan Veingrad, Offensive Tackle

LSC Second Team
 Chris Flynn, Defensive Back
 Vince Murray, Defensive Back
 Gaylon Surratt, Defensive Back
 Kyle Mackey, Quarterback

References

East Texas State
Texas A&M–Commerce Lions football seasons
Lone Star Conference football champion seasons
East Texas State Lions football